Malthodes is a genus of soldier beetles in the family Cantharidae. There are at least 120 described species in Malthodes.

See also
 List of Malthodes species

References

Further reading

 
 
 

Cantharidae